The 1930 DePaul Blue Demons football team was an American football team that represented DePaul University as an independent during the 1930 college football season. In its sixth season under head coach Eddie Anderson, the team compiled a 4–2–1 record and outscored opponents by a total of 67 to 44.

Schedule

References

DePaul
DePaul Blue Demons football seasons
DePaul Blue Demons football